Octamyrtus is a group of plants in the myrtle family Myrtaceae described as a genus in 1922. It is native to New Guinea and to the nearby Indonesian Province of Maluku.

Species
 Octamyrtus arfakensis Kaneh. & Hatus. ex C.T.White - West New Guinea
 Octamyrtus behrmannii Diels - New Guinea
 Octamyrtus glomerata Kaneh. & Hatus. ex C.T.White - New Guinea
 Octamyrtus halmaherensis Craven & Sunarti - Halmahera
 Octamyrtus insignis Diels - New Guinea
 Octamyrtus pleiopetala Diels - New Guinea, Aru Islands

References

Myrtaceae
Myrtaceae genera
Australasian realm flora